Khorusi may refer to:
 Khorusi-ye Jonubi
 Khorusi-ye Shomali